Nannacara aureocephalus is a species of cichlid endemic to French Guiana in South America where it occurs in the Approuague River basin.  Its habitat is shallow water near the edges of swamps, and areas of stagnant water in forest creeks.  It is considered a dwarf cichlid and can be found in the aquarium trade. The male reaches a length of  SL while the females reach a length of  TL.

References

External links
 Distribution map - Practical Fishkeeping
 Nannacara aureocephalus - aquavisie.retry.org

aureocephalus
Fish described in 1983